Chesterfield Highlands Historic District is a national historic district located at Colonial Heights, Virginia. The district encompasses 305 contributing buildings and 1 contributing structure. The district was developed in the early decades of the 20th century as a carefully planned middle-class neighborhood in a gridiron plan.  The primarily residential district includes dwellings in a variety of popular late 19th and early 20th century architectural styles.  Located in the district are the Highland Methodist Episcopal Church (1920), Immanuel Baptist Church (1932), and Colonial Heights Presbyterian Church (1950).

It was listed on the National Register of Historic Places in 2013.

References

Historic districts on the National Register of Historic Places in Virginia
Buildings and structures in Colonial Heights, Virginia
National Register of Historic Places in Colonial Heights, Virginia